Pannonia was a province of the Roman Empire bounded on the north and east by the Danube, coterminous westward with Noricum and upper Italy, and southward with Dalmatia and upper Moesia. Pannonia was located in the territory that is now western Hungary, western Slovakia, eastern Austria, northern Croatia, north-western Serbia, northern Slovenia, and northern Bosnia and Herzegovina.

Name

Julius Pokorny believed the name Pannonia is derived from Illyrian, from the Proto-Indo-European root *pen-, "swamp, water, wet" (cf. English fen, "marsh"; Hindi pani, "water").

Pliny the Elder, in Natural History, places the eastern regions of the Hercynium jugum, the "Hercynian mountain chain", in Pannonia and Dacia (now Romania). He also gives us some dramaticised description of its composition, in which the proximity of the forest trees causes competitive struggle among them (inter se rixantes). He mentions its gigantic oaks. But even he—if the passage in question is not an interpolated marginal gloss—is subject to the legends of the gloomy forest. He mentions unusual birds, which have feathers that "shine like fires at night". Medieval bestiaries named these birds the Ercinee. The impenetrable nature of the Hercynia Silva hindered the last concerted Roman foray into the forest, by Drusus, during 12–9 BC: Florus asserts that Drusus invisum atque inaccessum in id tempus Hercynium saltum (Hercynia saltus, the "Hercynian ravine-land") patefecit.

History

Prior to Roman conquest

The first inhabitants of this area known to history were the Pannonii (Pannonians), a group of Indo-European tribes akin to Illyrians. From the 4th century BC, it was invaded by various Celtic tribes. Trade flourished between Latins and Celts for one and a half century before the sudden Roman invasion. The country was not, however, definitively subdued by the Romans until 9 BC, when it was incorporated into Illyricum, the frontier of which was thus extended as far as the Danube.

Under Roman rule
The expansion of Dacians into Pannonia pressured Rome to prevent them from fully conquering it. Cotiso was defeated by Augustus and with his death in 9 BC, Pannonia fully came under Roman control.  

In AD 6, the Pannonians, with the Dalmatians and other Illyrian tribes, engaged in the so-called Great Illyrian Revolt, and were overcome by Tiberius and Germanicus, after a hard-fought campaign, which lasted for three years. After the rebellion was crushed in AD 9, the province of Illyricum was dissolved, and its lands were divided between the new provinces of Pannonia in the north and Dalmatia in the south. The date of the division is unknown, most certainly after AD 20 but before AD 50. The proximity of dangerous barbarian tribes (Quadi, Marcomanni) necessitated the presence of a large number of troops (seven legions in later times), and numerous fortresses were built on the bank of the Danube.

Some time between the years 102 and 107, between the first and second Dacian wars, Trajan divided the province into Pannonia Superior (western part with the capital Carnuntum), and Pannonia Inferior (eastern part with the capitals in Aquincum and Sirmium). According to Ptolemy, these divisions were separated by a line drawn from Arrabona in the north to Servitium in the south; later, the boundary was placed further east. The whole country was sometimes called the Pannonias (Pannoniae).

Pannonia Superior was under the consular legate, who had formerly administered the single province, and had three legions under his control. Pannonia Inferior was at first under a praetorian legate with a single legion as the garrison; after Marcus Aurelius, it was under a consular legate, but still with only one legion. The frontier on the Danube was protected by the establishment of the two colonies Aelia Mursia and Aelia Aquincum by Hadrian.

Under Diocletian, a fourfold division of the country was made:
 Pannonia Prima in the northwest, with its capital in Savaria / Sabaria, it included Upper Pannonia and the major part of Central Pannonia between the Raba and Drava,
 Pannonia Valeria in the northeast, with its capital in Sopianae, it comprised the remainder of Central Pannonia between the Raba, Drava and Danube,
 Pannonia Savia in the southwest, with its capital in Siscia,
 Pannonia Secunda in the southeast, with its capital in Sirmium

Diocletian also moved parts of today's Slovenia out of Pannonia and incorporated them in Noricum. In 324 AD, Constantine I enlarged the borders of Roman Pannonia to the east, annexing the plains of what is now eastern Hungary, northern Serbia and western Romania up to the limes that he created: the Devil's Dykes.

In the 4th-5th century, one of the dioceses of the Roman Empire was known as the Diocese of Pannonia. It had its capital in Sirmium and included all four provinces that were formed from historical Pannonia, as well as the provinces of Dalmatia, Noricum Mediterraneum and Noricum Ripense.

In the 4th century, the Romans (especially under Valentinian I) fortified the villas and relocated barbarians to the border regions. In 358 they won a great victory over the Sarmatians, but raids didn't stop. In 401 the Visigoths fled to the province from the Huns, and the border guarding peoples fled to Italia from them, but were beaten by Uldin in exchange for the transferring of Eastern Pannonia. In 433 Rome completely handed over the territory to Attila for the subjugation of the Burgundians attacking Gaul.

Post-Roman

During the Migration Period in the 5th century, some parts of Pannonia were ceded to the Huns in 433 by Flavius Aetius, the magister militum of the Western Roman Empire. After the collapse of the Hunnic empire in 454, large numbers of Ostrogoths were settled by Emperor Marcian in the province as foederati. The Eastern Roman Empire controlled southern parts of Pannonia in the 6th century, during the reign of Justinian I. The Byzantine province of Pannonia with its capital at Sirmium was temporarily restored, but it included only a small southeastern part of historical Pannonia.

Afterwards, it was again invaded by the Avars in the 560s, and the Slavs, who first may settled c. 480s but became independent only from the 7th century. In 790s, it was invaded by the Franks, who used the name "Pannonia" to designate the newly formed frontier province, the March of Pannonia. The term Pannonia was also used for Slavic polity like Lower Pannonia that was vassal to the Frankish Empire.

Between the 5th and the 10th centuries, the romanized population of Pannonia developed the Romance Pannonian language, mainly around Lake Balaton in present-day western Hungary, where there was the keszthely culture. This language and the related culture became extinct with the arrival of the Magyars.

Cities and auxiliary forts

The cities and towns in Pannonia were:

Now in Austria:
 Carnuntum (Petronell, Bad Deutsch-Altenburg)
 Vindobona (Vienna)

Now in Bosnia and Herzegovina:
 Saldae (Brčko)
 Serbinum or Servitium (Gradiška)
 Castrum and Canabea (Doboj)

Now in Croatia:
 Ad Novas (Zmajevac)
 Andautonia (Ščitarjevo)
 Aqua Viva (Petrijanec)
 Aquae Balisae (Daruvar)
 Certissa (Đakovo)
 Cibalae (Vinkovci)
 Cornacum (Sotin)
 Cuccium (Ilok)
 Iovia or Iovia Botivo (Ludbreg)
 Marsonia (Slavonski Brod)
 Mursa (Osijek)
 Siscia (Sisak)
 Teutoburgium (Dalj)

Now in Hungary:
 Ad Flexum (Mosonmagyaróvár)
 Ad Mures (Ács)
 Ad Statuas (Vaspuszta)
 Ad Statuas (Várdomb)
 Alisca (Szekszárd)
 Alta Ripa (Tolna)
 Aquincum (Óbuda, Budapest)
 Arrabona (Győr)
 Brigetio (Szőny)
 Caesariana (Baláca)
 Campona (Nagytétény)
 Cirpi (Dunabogdány)
 Contra-Aquincum (Budapest)
 Contra Constantiam (Dunakeszi)
 Gorsium-Herculia (Tác)
 Intercisa (Dunaújváros)
 Iovia (Szakcs)
 Lugio (Dunaszekcső)
 Lussonium (Dunakömlőd)
 Matrica (Százhalombatta)
 Morgentianae (Tüskevár (?))
 Mursella (Mórichida)
 Quadrata (Lébény)
 Sala (Zalalövő)
 Savaria or Sabaria (Szombathely)
 Scarbantia (Sopron)
 Solva (Esztergom)
 Sopianae (Pécs)
 Ulcisia Castra (Szentendre)
 Valcum (Fenékpuszta)

Now in Serbia:
 Acumincum (Stari Slankamen)
 Ad Herculae (Čortanovci)
 Bassianae (Donji Petrovci)
 Bononia (Banoštor)
 Burgenae (Novi Banovci)
 Cusum (Petrovaradin)
 Graio (Sremska Rača)
 Onagrinum (Begeč)
 Rittium (Surduk)
 Sirmium (Sremska Mitrovica)
 Taurunum (Zemun)

Now in Slovakia:
 Gerulata (Rusovce)

Now in Slovenia:
 Celeia (Celje)
 Neviodunum (Drnovo)
 Poetovio (Ptuj)

Economy and country features

The country was fairly productive, especially after the great forests had been cleared by Probus and Galerius. Before that time, timber had been one of its most important exports. Its chief agricultural products were oats and barley, from which the inhabitants brewed a kind of beer named sabaea. Vines and olive trees were little cultivated. Pannonia was also famous for its breed of hunting dogs. Although no mention is made of its mineral wealth by the ancients, it is probable that it contained iron and silver mines. Its chief rivers were the Dravus, Savus, and Arrabo, in addition to the Danuvius (less correctly, Danubius), into which the first three rivers flow.

Legacy
The ancient name Pannonia is retained in the modern term Pannonian plain.

See also
 Pannonian plain
 Roman provinces
 Diocese of Pannonia

References

Sources

Further reading
Parat, Josip. "Izbori i pregledi antičkih literarnih izvora za povijest južne Panonije" [Selections and Surveys of Ancient Literary Sources for the History of Southern Pannonia]. In: Scrinia Slavonica 15, br. 1 (2015): 9-33.

External links

 
  
 
 Pannonia map
 Pannonia map
 Aerial photography: Gorsium - Tác - Hungary
 Aerial photography: Aquincum - Budapest - Hungary

 
Provinces of the Roman Empire
.
Austria in the Roman era
Bosnia and Herzegovina in the Roman era
Croatia in the Roman era
Hungary in the Roman era
Illyricum (Roman province)
Serbia in the Roman era
Slovakia in the Roman era
Slovenia in the Roman era
Ancient history of Vojvodina
States and territories established in the 1st century
States and territories disestablished in the 2nd century
20 establishments
20s establishments in the Roman Empire
100s disestablishments in the Roman Empire
107 disestablishments
Rusyn communities